Tyoply Klyuch is the name of several rural localities in Russia:
Tyoply Klyuch, Republic of Bashkortostan, a village in Verkhnekiginsky Selsoviet of Kiginsky District in the Republic of Bashkortostan; 
Tyoply Klyuch, Abansky District, Krasnoyarsk Krai, a settlement in Apano-Klyuchinsky Selsoviet of Abansky District in Krasnoyarsk Krai
Tyoply Klyuch, Krasnoturansky District, Krasnoyarsk Krai, a settlement in Sayansky Selsoviet of Krasnoturansky District in Krasnoyarsk Krai
Tyoply Klyuch, Penza Oblast, a village in Yeremeyevsky Selsoviet of Sosnovoborsky District in Penza Oblast
Tyoply Klyuch, Sakha Republic, a selo in Teploklyuchevsky Rural Okrug of Tomponsky District in the Sakha Republic
Tyoply Klyuch, Sverdlovsk Oblast, a village in Karginsky Selsoviet of Achitsky District in Sverdlovsk Oblast
Tyoply Klyuch, Republic of Tatarstan, a village in Vysokogorsky District of the Republic of Tatarstan